EEVIAC Operational Index and Reference Guide, Including Other Modern Computational Devices is the 5th full-length studio album by Man or Astroman?. E.E.V.I.A.C. is an acronym and stands for "Embedded Electronic Variably Integrated Astro Console" (also known as the "EEVIAC Mainframe Supercomputer") and is a play on ENIAC, which is sometimes hailed as the first modern computer.

Man or Astroman? actually built a mockup of a supercomputer to have onstage for this album.

Track listing
 "Interstellar Hardrive"
 "D:Contamination"
 "U-235/PU-239"
 "Domain of the Human Race"
 "Theme from EEVIAC"
 "A Reversal of Polarity"
 "Fractionalized Reception of a Scrambled Transmission"
 "Engines of Difference"
 "Psychology of A.I. (Numbers Follow Answers)"
 "Krasnoyask-26"
 "Within the Mainframe, Impaired Vision from Inoperable Cataracts Can Become a New Impending Nepotism"
 "As Estrelas Agora Elas Estão Mortas"
 "_/Myopia"
 "Automated Liner Notes Sequence" (unlisted)

References

Man or Astro-man? albums
1999 albums
Touch and Go Records albums